Bertholdia specularis is a moth of the family Erebidae. It was described by Gottlieb August Wilhelm Herrich-Schäffer in 1853. It is found in Mexico, Costa Rica, Nicaragua, Guatemala, Panama, Venezuela and Peru.

Subspecies
Bertholdia specularis specularis
Bertholdia specularis rufescens Rothschild, 1910 (Peru)

References

Phaegopterina
Moths described in 1853